Derrick Brangman (born 24 August 1987) is a Bermudian cricketer. He was named in Bermuda's squad for the 2013 ICC World Twenty20 Qualifier tournament. He made his Twenty20 debut during the tournament, against Scotland, on 15 November 2013.

In August 2019, he was named in Bermuda's squad for the Regional Finals of the 2018–19 ICC T20 World Cup Americas Qualifier tournament. He made his Twenty20 International (T20I) debut for Bermuda against Canada on 19 August 2019. In September 2019, he was named in Bermuda's squad for the 2019 ICC T20 World Cup Qualifier tournament in the United Arab Emirates. In November 2019, he was named in Bermuda's squad for the Cricket World Cup Challenge League B tournament in Oman. He made his List A debut, for Bermuda against Kenya, on 8 December 2019.

References

External links
 

1987 births
Living people
Bermudian cricketers
Bermuda Twenty20 International cricketers
Place of birth missing (living people)